Michael Paul Devenney (born 8 February 1980) in Bolton, England, is an English retired professional footballer who played as a defender for Burnley in the Football League.

He made his debut on 8 December 1998, in the 1–0 defeat against local rivals Preston North End in the Football League Trophy Northern Section 1st Round, coming on as a substitute in the 74th minute replacing Rune Vindheim.

In September 2000, he joined Football Conference side Leigh RMI on a one month loan deal and made five appearances for the club.

References

External links

English footballers
Association football defenders
Burnley F.C. players
Leigh Genesis F.C. players
National League (English football) players
Footballers from Bolton
1980 births
Living people